Belgian culture involves both the aspects shared by all Belgians regardless of the language they speak and the differences between the main cultural communities:  the Dutch-speaking Belgians (Flemish) and the French-speaking Belgians (mostly Brussels and Walloon people). Most Belgians view their culture as an integral part of European culture.

The territory corresponding to present-day Belgium having always been located at the meeting point of Germanic and Latin Europe, it benefited from a rich cross-fertilization of cultures for centuries. Due to its strategic position in the heart of Europe, Belgium has been at the origin of many European artistic and cultural movements.

Famous elements of the Belgian culture include gastronomy (Belgian beers, fries, chocolate, waffles, etc.), the comic strip tradition (Tintin, the Smurfs, Spirou & Fantasio, the Marsupilami, Lucky Luke, Largo Winch, etc.), painting and architecture (the Art Nouveau, the Mosan art, the Early Netherlandish painting, the Flemish renaissance and Baroque painting as well as major examples of Romanesque, Gothic, Renaissance and Baroque architecture), folklore, and surrealism (in art as well as in the attitude of most Belgians).

Since modern culture is more than ever related to languages (theatres, media, literature, etc), the modern Belgian cultural life has tended to develop in each linguistic community (with common elements however). Members of each of the two main linguistic groups generally make their cultural choices from within their own language community, and then, when going beyond, the Flemish draw intensively from both the English-speaking culture (which dominates sciences, professional life and most news media) and the Netherlands, whereas French-speakers tend to focus more on cultural life in France and elsewhere in the French-speaking world even though the English-speaking culture is more present in French-speaking Belgium than in France.

Minorities, such as the Jews who have formed a component of Flemish culture — in particular that of Antwerp — for over five hundred years, have specific cultures.

Art

Painting

Belgium's contributions to painting have been especially rich. The Mosan art, the Early Netherlandish, the Flemish Renaissance, and Baroque painting are milestones in the history of art. While the 15th century's art in the Low Countries is dominated by the religious paintings of Jan van Eyck and Rogier van der Weyden, the 16th century is characterised by a broader panel of styles such as Peter Breughel's landscape paintings and Lambert Lombard's representation of the antique. Though the Baroque style of Peter Paul Rubens and Anthony van Dyck flourished in the early 17th century in the Southern Netherlands, it gradually declined thereafter.

During the 19th and 20th centuries many original romantic, expressionist and surrealist Belgian painters emerged, including James Ensor and other artists belonging to the Les XX group, Constant Permeke, Paul Delvaux and René Magritte. The avant-garde CoBrA movement appeared in the 1950s, while the sculptor Panamarenko remains a remarkable figure in contemporary art. Multidisciplinary artists Jan Fabre, Wim Delvoye and the painter Luc Tuymans are other internationally renowned figures on the contemporary art scene.

Comics

Belgium has numerous well-known cartoonists, such as Hergé (The Adventures of Tintin), Peyo (The Smurfs), Franquin (Spirou et Fantasio, Marsupilami, Gaston), Willy Vandersteen (Spike and Suzy), Morris (Lucky Luke), Edgar P. Jacobs (Blake and Mortimer), Jef Nys (Jommeke) and Marc Sleen (Nero). More recently, Jean Van Hamme (XIII, Largo Winch, Thorgal, etc.), Raoul Cauvin (Les Tuniques Bleues, Agent 212), François Schuiten and Benoît Peeters (Les Cités Obscures) are among the most read cartoonists.

Belgium is home to some of the most important European comics magazines and publishers, with Dupuis (Spirou magazine), Le Lombard (Tintin magazine) and Casterman.

Museums
Some of the most impressive museums in Belgium are The Royal Museum for Fine Arts, in Antwerp, which has an admirable collection of works by Peter Paul Rubens, the Groeningemuseum, in Bruges, with the Flemish Primitives, the MAS (Museum Aan De Stroom) in Antwerp which is located on 't eilandje is the biggest museum in Belgium, and the Royal Museums of Fine Arts of Belgium in Brussels, which has a cinema, a concert hall and artworks of many periods, including a large René Magritte collection.

Furthermore, the Plantin-Moretus Museum in Antwerp, a world heritage site, is the complete factory of the largest publishing house of the 17th century.

Architecture

Examples of Belgian architecture include the Romanesque Collégiale Saint-Gertrude de Nivelles (1046) and Cathédrale Notre-Dame de Tournai, the Gothic 15th-century Cathedral of Our Lady in Antwerp and Baroque Brussels Grand-Place. Mosan style  is typical of the architecture within the Prince-Bishopric of Liège.

Belgian contributions to architecture also continued into the 19th and 20th centuries, including the work of Victor Horta and Henry van de Velde, who were major initiators of the Art Nouveau style in Belgium and abroad.

Literature

Belgium has produced several well-known authors, including the poets Emile Verhaeren, Guido Gezelle, Robert Goffin, Paul van Ostaijen, and Henri Michaux, as well as the novelists Hendrik Conscience, Stijn Streuvels, Charles de Coster, Willem Elsschot, Michel de Ghelderode, Georges Simenon, Louis Paul Boon, Suzanne Lilar, Hugo Claus, Pierre Mertens, Ernest Claes, and Amélie Nothomb. The poet and playwright Maurice Maeterlinck won the Nobel Prize in literature in 1911.

Belgian literature was more cohesive in the past but is now divided based on linguistic lines. Until the mid-20th century, Belgian writers more often wrote in French even if they were Flemish, due both to the then-dominant position of that language in worldwide culture as well as within Belgium itself (e.g. Suzanne Lilar, Emile Verhaeren, and Maurice Maeterlinck). As the Flemish movement grew in importance, Dutch-penned authors became increasingly prominent in Flanders and even played an important role in the said movement (e.g. Hendrik Conscience). Important contemporary Flemish authors are Tom Lanoye or Dimitri Verhulst.

Belgian francophone literature is sometimes difficult to distinguish from French literature as a whole, because several great French authors went to Belgium for refuge (e.g. Apollinaire, Baudelaire, Rimbaud, Verlaine, and more recently Eric-Emmanuel Schmitt) and conversely, top French-speaking writers sometimes settle in Paris (e.g. Simenon and Amélie Nothomb). Belgian francophone literature is characterised by authors who achieved a nationwide success in Belgium while being little known in France, and shares traits that are perceived as typically Belgian: use of black humour, self-derision, surrealism and absurdism (in a similar vein as Belgian painters such as René Magritte), as well as references to Belgian history and society (such as Belgian royalty, language conflicts, former colony of the Congo, Belgian beers and gastronomy, and whatever is typically Belgian) and they are often active in Belgian medias as columnists or entertainers. Such authors include Thomas Gunzig, Juan d'Oultremont, and Jacques Mercier.

There have also been writers in the Walloon language, such as Nicolas Defrecheux and Edouard Remouchamps.

Cinema

Belgian cinema has brought a number of mainly Flemish novels to life on-screen. Notable examples include De Witte (1934, remake as De Witte van Sichem, 1980); De man die zijn haar kort liet knippen (1965); Mira (1971); Malpertuis (1971); De loteling (1974); Dood van een non (1975); Pallieter (1976); De komst van Joachim Stiller (1976); De Leeuw van Vlaanderen (1985); and Daens (1992).

Belgian films have been awarded several times at the Cannes Film Festival and in other less-known festivals. They are generally made with a small budget, and are mostly funded by the regional governments (the Vlaams Audiovisueel Fonds, and Wallimage, among others) and private corporations by means of sponsorship and product placement.

Famous Belgian directors include André Delvaux, Stijn Coninx, Luc and Jean-Pierre Dardenne; well-known actors include Jean-Claude Van Damme, Jan Decleir and Marie Gillain; and successful films include Bullhead, Man Bites Dog and The Alzheimer Affair.

Music

The vocal music of the Franco-Flemish School developed in the southern part of the Low Countries and was an important contribution to Renaissance culture. Many great medieval and Renaissance composers, such as Gilles Binchois, Orlande de Lassus, Guillaume Dufay, Heinrich Isaac, and Jacob Obrecht came from the area which is now Belgium.

In the 19th and 20th centuries, there was an emergence of major violinists, such as Henri Vieuxtemps, Eugène Ysaÿe and Arthur Grumiaux. Adolphe Sax, the inventor of the saxophone, was born in Belgium, and so were many important classical composers. One of the most famous is César Franck, but Guillaume Lekeu and Wim Mertens are also noteworthy.

Contemporary popular music in Belgium is also of repute. Well-known singers include Lara Fabian, Stromae, Jacques Brel, Arno, Maurane, Bobbejaan Schoepen, Salvatore Adamo, Philippe Lafontaine and Pierre Rapsat. Other popular Belgian pop acts include Axelle Red, Vaya Con Dios, Kate Ryan and K3. In rock/pop music, Telex, Front 242, K's Choice, Hooverphonic, Zap Mama, Soulwax and dEUS are well known. In the heavy metal scene, bands like Machiavel, Channel Zero and Enthroned have a worldwide fan-base. Belgium has a very active jazz scene that is achieving international recognition with bands like Aka Moon, Maak's Spirit and Octurn. Harmonicist Toots Thielemans, guitarist Philip Catherine and Django Reinhardt are probably the best known Belgian jazz musicians. Belgian hip-hop started with the rise of Starflam, CNN (a Brussels-based crew) and 't Hof van Commerce in the mid-1990s. The country has also influenced electronic music with a.o. Front 242, Praga Khan (also known as Lords of Acid) and 2 Many DJ's.

Belgium is also home to some very popular music festivals such as Tomorrowland, Rock Werchter and Pukkelpop.

Fashion
Belgium is also home to a number of successful fashion designers. For instance, in the 1980s, Antwerp's Royal Academy of Fine Arts produced important fashion trendsetters, known as the Antwerp Six.

Cuisine

Belgium is famous for beer, chocolate, waffles and French fries. The national dishes are "steak and fries", and "mussels with fries". Many highly ranked Belgian restaurants can be found in the most influential restaurant guides, such as the Michelin Guide. One of the many beers with the high prestige is that of the Trappist monks. Technically, it is an ale and traditionally each abbey's beer is served in its own glass (the forms, heights and widths are different). There are only eleven breweries (six of them are Belgian) that are allowed to brew Trappist beer.

Although Belgian gastronomy is connected to French cuisine, some recipes were reputedly invented there, such as French fries (despite the name, although their exact place of origin is uncertain), Flemish Stew (a beef stew with beer, mustard and bay laurel), speculaas (or speculoos in French, a sort of cinnamon and ginger-flavoured shortcrust biscuit), Brussels waffles (and their variant, Liège waffles), waterzooi (a broth made with chicken or fish, cream and vegetables), endive with bechamel sauce, Brussels sprouts, Belgian pralines (Belgium has some of the most renowned chocolate houses), charcuterie (deli meats) and Paling in 't groen (river eels in a sauce of green herbs).

Brands of Belgian chocolate and pralines, like Côte d'Or, Neuhaus, Leonidas and Godiva are famous, as well as independent producers such as Burie and Del Rey in Antwerp and Mary's in Brussels. Belgium produces over 1100 varieties of beer. The Trappist beer of the Abbey of Westvleteren has repeatedly been rated the world's best beer.
The biggest brewer in the world by volume is Anheuser-Busch InBev, based in Leuven.

Folklore

Folklore plays a major role in Belgium's cultural life; the country has a comparatively high number of processions, cavalcades, parades, ommegangs, ducasses, kermesses, and other local festivals, nearly always with an originally religious or mythological background. The three-day Carnival of Binche, near Mons, with its famous Gilles (men dressed in high, plumed hats and bright costumes) is held just before Lent (the 40 days between Ash Wednesday and Easter). Together with the 'Processional Giants and Dragons' of Ath, Brussels, Dendermonde, Mechelen and Mons, it is recognised by UNESCO as a Masterpiece of the Oral and Intangible Heritage of Humanity.

Other examples are the three-day Carnival of Aalst in February or March; the still very religious processions of the Holy Blood taking place in Bruges in May, the Virga Jesse procession held every seven years in Hasselt, the annual procession of Hanswijk in Mechelen, the 15 August festivities in Liège, and the Walloon festival in Namur. Originated in 1832 and revived in the 1960s, the Gentse Feesten (a music and theatre festival organised in Ghent around Belgian National Day, on 21 July) have become a modern tradition. Several of these festivals include sporting competitions, such as cycling, and many fall under the category of kermesses.

A major non-official holiday (which is however not an official public holiday) is Saint Nicholas Day (Dutch: Sinterklaas, French: la Saint-Nicolas), a festivity for children, and in Liège, for students. It takes place each year on 6 December and is a sort of early Christmas. On the evening of 5 December, before going to bed, children put their shoes by the hearth with water or wine and a carrot for Saint Nicholas's horse or donkey. According to tradition, Saint Nicholas comes at night and travels down the chimney. He then takes the food and water or wine, leaves presents, goes back up, feeds his horse or donkey, and continues on his course. He also knows whether children have been good or bad. This holiday is especially loved by children in Belgium and the Netherlands. Dutch immigrants imported the tradition into the United States, where Saint Nicholas is now known as Santa Claus.

See also
 List of Belgians
 Europalia

Notes

References

External links
 Belgium portal in Dutch, English, French, and German
 Exploring Belgium's cultural identity
 Grooming yourself for Belgian society